Fillmore is a small city in Ventura County, California, United States, in the Santa Clara River Valley. In an agricultural area with rich, fertile soil, Fillmore has a historic downtown that was established when the Southern Pacific built the railroad through the valley in 1887. The rail line also provided a name for the town: J. A. Fillmore was a general superintendent for the company's Pacific system. The population was 16,419 at the 2020 census, up 9.4% from 15,002 during the 2010 census.

History
In 1769, the Spanish Portola expedition, first Europeans to see inland areas of California, came down the valley from the previous night's encampment near today's Rancho Camulos and camped in the vicinity of Fillmore on August 11. Fray Juan Crespi, a Franciscan missionary travelling with the expedition, had previously named the valley Cañada de Santa Clara. He noted that the party travelled about 9–10 miles and camped near a large native village.

Founded in 1887 upon the arrival of the Southern Pacific Rail line, the city voted to incorporate in 1914, after a vigorous campaign by local business owners and the Fillmore Herald.

In 1985, the city council voted to make English the city's official language. The resolution was repealed in 1999.

At about 4:30am the morning of January 17, 1994, Fillmore sustained significant damage from the Northridge earthquake. It was the worst-hit community in Ventura County. No one in the community died or was injured, but over 200 buildings were damaged, including about one-fifth of the historical downtown that had been the center of numerous Hollywood films and TV shows. The quake caused an estimated $50 million in property damage and losses. Ultimately, 60 buildings needed to be torn down, and Fillmore rebuilt most of its downtown area.

Geography
Fillmore sits at the foot of Topatopa Mountains in the Santa Clara River Valley, below San Cayetano peak in the Los Padres National Forest. The Sespe Condor Sanctuary, where the critically endangered California condor is recovering, lies in the Topatopa range to the north.

The town is famous for its many orange groves. Most houses are cottages, bungalows and old homes. Over half of all homes were constructed after 1970. The oldest buildings are found in downtown, which is centered around Central Street. Particularly the western part of the city has newer residential communities. Most businesses are located on Ventura Street (Highway 126).

The nearby Sespe Creek is a tributary of the Santa Clara River. Fillmore is within a historic Ventura County agricultural and tree-farming belt.

Climate
This region experiences hot and dry summers. Temperatures can easily reach above 100 degrees . According to the Köppen Climate Classification system, Fillmore has a warm-summer Mediterranean climate, abbreviated "Csb" on climate maps.

Demographics

2010
The 2010 United States Census reported that Fillmore had a population of 15,002. The racial makeup of Fillmore was 8,581 (57.2%) White, 75 (0.5%) African American, 180 (1.2%) Native American, 155 (1.0%) Asian, 12 (0.1%) Pacific Islander, 5,204 (34.7%) from other races, and 795 (5.3%) from two or more races. Hispanic or Latino of any race were 11,212 persons (74.7%).

The Census reported that 14,836 people (98.9% of the population) lived in households, 83 (0.6%) lived in non-institutionalized group quarters, and 83 (0.6%) were institutionalized.

There were 4,156 households, out of which 2,053 (49.4%) had children under the age of 18 living in them, 2,483 (59.7%) were opposite-sex married couples living together, 569 (13.7%) had a female householder with no husband present. 312 (7.5%) had a male householder with no wife present.  There were 259 (6.2%) unmarried opposite-sex partnerships, and 34 (0.8%) same-sex married couples or partnerships. 642 households (15.4%) were made up of individuals, and 299 (7.2%) had someone living alone who was 65 years of age or older. The average household size was 3.57.  There were 3,364 families (80.9% of all households); the average family size was 3.92.

The population was spread out, with 4,534 people (30.2%) under the age of 18, 1,555 people (10.4%) aged 18 to 24, 4,141 people (27.6%) aged 25 to 44, 3,221 people (21.5%) aged 45 to 64, and 1,551 people (10.3%) who were 65 years of age or older.  The median age was 31.9 years. For every 100 females, there were 99.8 males. For every 100 females age 18 and over, there were 98.9 males.

The homeowner vacancy rate was 3.0%; the rental vacancy rate was 4.5%.  9,324 people (62.2% of the population) lived in owner-occupied housing units and 5,512 people (36.7%) lived in rental housing units.

2000
As of the census of 2000, there were 13,643 people, 3,762 households, and 3,032 families residing in the city. The population density was 4,910.8 inhabitants per square mile (1,894.8/km2). The racial makeup of the city was 53.5% White, 0.3% African American, 1.4% Native American, 1% Asian, 0.1% Pacific Islander, and 39.5% from other races. Hispanic or Latino of any race were 66.6% of the population.

There were 3,762 households, out of which 45.8% had children under the age of 18 living with them, 62.3% were married couples living together, 12.8% had a female householder with no husband present, and 19.4% were non-families. 16.1% of all households were made up of individuals, and 9.1% had someone living alone who was 65 years of age or older.  The average household size was 3.56 and the average family size was 3.94.

In the city, the population was spread out, with 32.3% under the age of 18, 10.7% from 18 to 24, 29.0% from 25 to 44, 17.5% from 45 to 64, and 10.4% who were 65 years of age or older.  The median age was 30 years. For every 100 females, there were 101.7 males.  For every 100 females age 18 and over, there were 102.4 males.

The median income for a household in the city was $45,510, and the median income for a family was $47,449. Males had a median income of $34,441 versus $24,660 for females. The per capita income for the city was $15,010.  About 11.4% of families and 13.2% of the population were below the poverty line, including 17.3% of those under age 18 and 7.4% of those age 65 or over.

Economy
Fillmore's economy is still largely driven by agriculture. Most agricultural industry in the Fillmore area is related to orange, lemon, avocado orchard farming and packing and, more recently, specimen tree farming.  To a lesser extent, row crop farming and small industry and assembly are also present in and near Fillmore and in other parts of the Santa Clara River Valley. The single largest employer is the Fillmore Unified School District.

In 2014, a plan was presented for a business park on the old Chevron refinery property east of Fillmore.

Tourism
Fillmore has turn of the 20th century downtown architecture, the one-screen Fillmore Towne Theatre, and many unique shops and businesses. Adjacent to the railroad tracks and city hall is the Railroad Visitor Center operated by the Santa Clara River Valley Railroad Historical Society, which has many displays as well as a fully operational  train turntable and several restored railroad cars.

The Fillmore Historical Museum includes the restored Southern Pacific Railroad Fillmore 1887 standard-design One Story Combination Depot No. 11 built in 1887, a 1956 Southern Pacific railroad caboose, and railroad-related displays. The Fillmore and Western Railway trains took tourists through the orchards for thirty years until it ceased operations in 2021. The small post office from the community of Bardsdale and a 1919 farm worker bunkhouse from Rancho Sespe were moved to the site along with the 1906 Craftsman-style Hinckley House, the home of the community's first dentist and druggist.  The bunkhouse contains many displays illustrating the history of Fillmore and the nearby communities of Bardsdale and Piru.

Located nearby are the Fillmore fish hatchery and the Sespe Creek and Sespe Wilderness, home to the California condor Sespe sanctuary.

Government 
The City of Fillmore is an established municipality within Ventura County, founded in 1888 and incorporated on July 10, 1914. The city is governed by a five-person council with the position of mayor and mayor pro-tem elected by the council every two years. Council members serve four-year terms.

Public safety

Law enforcement
Fillmore's Police Department is headed by Sheriff's Capt. Dave Wareham, 5 Patrol Sergeants, 2 Detectives, 35 regular deputies, 1 cadet and 1 dispatcher. Fillmore is also served by three Sheriff's Store Front Locations, a Juvenile Liaison Program with the School District, Citizens Patrol Disaster Response Team, Fillmore Mountain Search and Rescue Team and Citizens Patrol.

The Fillmore Police Department has a Bike Patrol Unit, which consists of eight specially trained deputies. The Bike Patrol is utilized for proactive patrols, civic events, enforcement of public nuisance crimes, and other team operations. Each year the Santa Clara Valley Station offers a Bike Rodeo for the youth in the community.

Also, the Fillmore Station is home to a Special Enforcement Detail that provides a variety of specialized duties including gang enforcement, tagging/graffiti investigations, and alcohol beverage control. This unit is utilized for any specific crime concerns that are beyond the scope of normal patrol resources.

In August 2001, the City of Fillmore introduced its first traffic enforcement motorcycle, a BMW bike, which was purchased with technology grant funds from the State. The motor officer's primary duty is to enforce traffic laws within the city and to investigate traffic accidents that occur within the city limits. The officer is trained in accident reconstruction, skid marks analysis, and accident investigation.* 

During events such as the Fillmore 4th of July Festival or the Fillmore May Festival, extra law enforcement is required.

Fire department
The Fillmore Fire Department provides fire protection and emergency medical services at the advanced life support (ALS) level. The Department is staffed with a combination of career and volunteer staff. American Medical Response (AMR) is the primary paramedic ambulance provider for the city while the Ventura County Fire Department provides 9-1-1 dispatching and telecommunication service.

Crime
Fillmore has an overall low crime rate.

Education 
The city is served by the Fillmore Unified School District. Educational facilities for the district include two high schools including, one middle school, and four elementary schools.

A fifth elementary school is located in the city of Piru, which is also a part of the school district. The Fillmore Christian Academy is a private K-8 school in town.

Elementary schools 
 San Cayetano Elementary School
 Rio Vista Elementary School
 Fillmore Christian Academy
 Mountain Vista Elementary School
 Rio Vista Elementary School

Junior high schools 
 Fillmore Middle School

High schools 
 Fillmore High School
 Sierra High School

Infrastructure

Transportation

Major highways
It is primarily served by State Highway 126 and State Highway 23.
 California State Highway 126
 California State Highway 23

Transit

VCTC
Fillmore is at the east end of the Ventura Intercity Service Transit Authority Highway 126 route that originates at the Pacific View Mall in Ventura, and operates along SR 126 to Saticoy, Santa Paula and Fillmore.

Valley Express
Fillmore will have its first regularly scheduled bus service. Fillmore will have a single bus on a 30-minute loop throughout the city, and one route running between Fillmore and Piru. Both city bus systems will connect to the regional Highway 126 bus to Ventura, with free, timed transfers.

Scheduled service began in 2015 for the Heritage Valley communities with two routes in Santa Paula, one route in Fillmore and one in Piru that runs to Fillmore. They are designed to mesh with the schedule of the VISTA Highway 126 route. 16-seat buses are used on the Valley Express. The dial-a-ride services in both cities, which for now are the only public transit option, will remain in operation after the bus routes start.

Wastewater treatment
Veolia North America operates the City of Fillmore Wastewater Treatment Plant.

Notable residents
Nati Cano (1933-2014), mariachi musician, former leader of Mariachi los Camperos 
Chad Hansen NFL Wide Receiver

In popular culture
While Rancho Camulos appears in the film Ramona (1910), Fillmore's State Fish Hatchery is featured in Susanna Pass (1949).

Movies shot in Fillmore include Hit and Run.

La Bamba was partially filmed in Fillmore. The old run-down house can be found in North Fillmore.

Well-preserved downtown Fillmore is a popular filming location for television and movies. The January 4, 2007, episode of CSI entitled Leaving Las Vegas prominently featured old-town Fillmore as the fictional town of "Larkston, Nevada". Scenes in the television series Jericho and Big Love are also filmed there.

The town of Paleto Bay in Grand Theft Auto V is based on Fillmore.

Fillmore was featured by Huell Howser in Road Trip Episode 102.

*NSYNC Recorded the Train scene in the music video of Bye Bye Bye in Fillmore.

See also
Historical Sycamore Tree
 Historical Bardsdale United Methodist Church

References

External links
 
 The Fillmore Gazette - Print and Online Newspaper of Record for the City of Fillmore
 Fillmore Chamber of Commerce
 Heritage Valley Website

 
Cities in Ventura County, California
Santa Clara River (California)
Populated places established in 1914
1914 establishments in California
Incorporated cities and towns in California